Sonia Leigh (born December 1978) is an American country music singer-songwriter. Following her 1998 debut, Remember Me, Leigh has performed extensively as a solo artist, headliner, and as the supporting act for Jason Mraz, The Marshall Tucker Band, Zac Brown Band, Blackberry Smoke.

Her 2007 release Run or Surrender was produced by John Hopkins of the Zac Brown Band. Her Southern Ground debut album, 1978 December, was released on September 27, 2011.  The first single off the album is "My Name Is Money," which Juli Thanki of Engine 145 gave a "thumbs up". Leigh also co-wrote the Zac Brown Band singles "Goodbye in Her Eyes" and "Sweet Annie".

Discography

Albums

Live albums

Singles

Music videos

References

External links
 

Living people
American country singer-songwriters
American women country singers
1978 births
People from Pike County, Georgia
21st-century American singers
21st-century American women singers
Country musicians from Georgia (U.S. state)
Singer-songwriters from Georgia (U.S. state)